Adam Swart Vedder (July 27, 1834 – October 8, 1905) was a rancher and political figure in British Columbia. He represented Westminster-Chilliwhack in the Legislative Assembly of British Columbia from 1897 to 1898.

He was born in Schenectady, New York, the son of Volkert Vedder and Agnes Swart, of Dutch descent, and was educated there. In 1846, he moved to Chicago and then, in 1852, moved to Sacramento, California where he worked at transporting supplies to the mines. In 1860, he moved to British Columbia, where he was again involved in transporting goods. In 1868, he began ranching near Sumas. Vedder was married twice: first to Althea Dicker in 1877 and then to Elizabeth Jackman in 1894. He served on the municipal council and was also warden for Chilliwack township. Vedder served as postmaster from 1888 to 1894. He was elected to the assembly in an 1897 by-election held following the death of Thomas Edwin Kitchen. Vedder died in Chilliwack at the age of 71.

His first wife is said to have chosen the name for the town of Sardis at random from her Bible.

References 

1834 births
1905 deaths
Politicians from Schenectady, New York
American emigrants to pre-Confederation British Columbia
American people of Dutch descent
Canadian people of Dutch descent
Independent MLAs in British Columbia